The Zambia national under-16 basketball team is a national basketball team of Zambia, administered by the Zambia Basketball Association (ZBA).

It represents the country in international under-16 (under age 16) basketball competitions.

It appeared at the 2015 FIBA Africa Under-16 Championship qualification stage.

See also
Zambia men's national basketball team
Zambia women's national under-16 basketball team

References

External links
Zambia Basketball Records at FIBA Archive

U-16
Men's national under-16 basketball teams